Michel Amani N'Guessan (born 1957) is an Ivorian politician and the current defence minister of Côte d'Ivoire for the Ivorian Popular Front (FPI).

Biography 
Born in Messoukro village in 1957, N'Guessan graduated from the University of Abidjan in 1984, with a specialisation in history and geography. He subsequently became a teacher and taught from 1985 to 1999, joining the FPI in 1990.

N'Guessan was appointed Minister of National Education in January 2000, during the military rule of Robert Guéï, and retained this post until April 7, 2007, when he assumed the position of defence minister.

References

1957 births
Living people
Education ministers of Ivory Coast
Defense ministers of Ivory Coast
Ivorian Popular Front politicians
People from Vallée du Bandama District
Université Félix Houphouët-Boigny alumni